Gat or GAT may refer to:

Places
 Gat, Iran, a village in Khuzestan Province, Iran
 Gat, Israel, a kibbutz in Israel
 Gat Rimon, a moshav in Israel
 Gát utca, a street in Ferencváros, Budapest, Hungary
 Gath (city), or Gat, an ancient Philistine city
 Fisherman's Gat, a channel in the Thames Estuary
 Kiryat Gat, a city in Israel
 Veerse Gat, a sea channel in Zeeland, Netherlands
 Hat, Azerbaijan, or Gat
 Gat, Croatia, a village near Belišće

People
 Gat Stires (1849–1933), a Major League Baseball right fielder
 Gat (surname)

Acronyms
 a GABA transporter, e.g. GAT1
 General Achievement Test, in schools in Victoria, Australia
 Graduate Assessment Test, for university programs in Pakistan
 Global Academy of Technology, Bangalore, India
 C7.GAT protein
 Glycine N-phenylacetyltransferase, an enzyme
 Galactoside acetyltransferase, an enzyme
 Generic Associated Types (a feature of the Rust programming language)

Other uses
 Gat (hat), a traditional Korean hat
 Gat (landform), a straight eroded by currents
 Gat (music), a Hindustani composition
 Gat (title), Philippines
 Johnny Gat, a character from the Saints Row video game series
 Kenati language
 Khat or gat, a stimulant plant
 Gat air pistol, UK, 1930s-1990s
 Gat, slang for a firearm
 GAT, a codon for the amino acid aspartic acid

See also
 GATT